Elegiac Ode, Op. 21, is a musical composition by British composer Charles Villiers Stanford (1852–1924) written and first performed in 1884. It is a four-movement work scored for baritone and soprano soloists, chorus and orchestra, Stanford's composition is a setting of Walt Whitmans 1865 elegy, "When Lilacs Last in the Dooryard Bloom'd", mourning the death of American president Abraham Lincoln.<ref name="SullivanSymphonies">Sullivan, Jack. New World Symphonies: How American Culture Changed European Music, 95ff.</ref> According to musicologist Jack Sullivan, Stanford's Elegiac Ode'' likely had reached a wider audience during Whitman's lifetime than his poems.

See also
List of compositions by Charles Villiers Stanford

References

1884 compositions
Compositions by Charles Villiers Stanford
Musical settings of poems by Walt Whitman